Mas huni is a typical Maldivian breakfast, comprising tuna, onion, coconut, and chili. All ingredients are finely chopped and mixed with the grated meat of the coconut. This dish is usually eaten with freshly baked roshi flatbread (similar to Indian chapati) and sweetened hot tea.

Preparation
The fish used in mas huni was as a rule cured tuna valhoamas but currently many Maldivians use canned tuna.

Traditionally when fish was scarce, chopped leaves were added to the mas huni mixture. The green leaves of certain local plants and trees such as diguthiyara (Senna occidentalis), kuḷhafilaa or gōramfau (Launaea sarmentosa), mābulhā (Abutilon theophrasti), muranga (Moringa oleifera), massāgu (Amaranthus spinosus or Amaranthus viridis) sweet potato (Ipomoea batatas) and ḷos (Pisonia grandis), among others, replaced the fish in mas huni in a smaller or greater proportion.

Mas huni may be made with kopee (collard greens) leaves. 

Another variant of mas huni is made with muranga pods (Moringa oleifera) instead of leaves. First the pods are boiled; then the flesh with the seeds is scooped out. This is mixed  with the rest of the ingredients. This same type of thicker mas huni can be also made with boiled butternut squash or pumpkin.

See also
Maldivian cuisine
 List of tuna dishes

References

Bibliography
Xavier Romero-Frias, Eating on the Islands, Himāl Southasian, Vol. 26 no. 2, pages 69–91

External links
Eating on the Islands - As times have changed, so has the Maldives' unique cuisine and culture
Mas huni and Masriha - Himal: Farms, Feasts, Famines; Disappearing foods

Maldivian cuisine
Tuna dishes
Foods containing coconut